Panauti Hydropower Station (also called Khopasi Hydropower Station) is the third hydropower station which was constructed in Nepal. It is the first megawatt(MW) capacity hydropower station in Nepal. It is a run-of-the-river hydroelectric plant on the Roshi Khola river. This power station is located at Khopasi, Kavre district, 35 km east of Kathmandu and 7 km south-east from Panauti Bazar.

It was built in 1965 with the assistance from then Soviet
Union at a cost of NRs 27 million. It has a capacity of 2.4 MW, from 3 units of 0.8 MW each and annual design generation of 6.97 GWh. The Project
was designed for operation of only two units at a
time with third unit as a standby. Open canal of
3,721 m long with discharge of 3.2 cu. m/s from
headwork to reservoir has seven (7) outlet gates
for irrigation in the vicinity of Khopasi.

After the major improvement activities accomplished in
2018/019 ( Rehabilitation and Modernization
of Switchyards of Panauti Hydropower Station
located at Khopasi and Bhakatpur ), Panauti Hydropower Station is
generating maximum annual energy (in 2018/19) which the
power plant had not been able to do since the last
11 years.

References

Hydroelectric power stations in Nepal
Soviet foreign aid
1965 establishments in Nepal
Buildings and structures in Kavrepalanchok District